The 1992 MAAC men's basketball tournament was held March 6–9, 1992 at Knickerbocker Arena in Albany, New York.

Number two seed La Salle defeated top-seeded  in the championship game, 79–78, to win their fourth MAAC men's basketball tournament.

The Explorers received an automatic bid to the 1992 NCAA tournament as the No. 13 seed in the East region.

Format
All nine of the conference's members participated in the tournament field. Teams were seeded based on regular season conference records. All games were played at Knickerbocker Arena in Albany, New York.

Bracket

References

MAAC men's basketball tournament
1991–92 Metro Atlantic Athletic Conference men's basketball season
1992 in sports in New York (state)